Yves Baré (28 October 1938 – 1 April 2010) was a Belgian footballer who played for RFC Liège, Beerschot VAV, Patro Eisden and the Belgium national team.

References

Belgian footballers
RFC Liège players
K. Patro Eisden Maasmechelen players
Association football defenders
1938 births
2010 deaths
Belgium international footballers